Suffering-focused ethics are those positions in ethics that give moral priority to the reduction of suffering. This means that they give greater weight to the reduction of suffering than to the promotion of pleasure, happiness, or to other things that one might consider valuable. According to some suffering-focused ethics, humans should concentrate exclusively on reducing preventable suffering. Other views can include additional features as the prevention of other disvalues or the promotion of other positive values while giving priority to reducing preventable suffering over them.

Different suffering-focused ethics 

"Suffering-focused ethics" is an umbrella term that covers different normative positions which share the common element of giving priority to suffering. Even though all these doctrines share this common general aim, they make different claims regarding how we should act. An example of these views is negative consequentialism, which claims that we should minimize suffering because a situation becomes better when there is less suffering in it. A form of negative consequentialism is negative utilitarianism, the view that we should aim at bringing about the least possible amount of aggregate suffering, adding up everyone's suffering as having equal value (no matter whose such suffering is).

Other suffering-focused views can be, however, deontologic ethics, and claim, instead, that we have agent-relative reasons when reducing suffering. They will claim that reducing suffering has priority over other moral goals in all cases. This moral imperative would prevail in all cases, regardless of whether they cause a situation to be better or worse. Finally, it can also be claimed that we should have dispositions in our character to behave as suffering reducers.

Suffering-focused ethics used to be named as "negative", as they consider that the reduction of what is negative is more important than the promotion of what has positive value. This term continues to be used in naming positions such as negative consequentialism, negative prioritarianism or negative utilitarianism. However, the use of the term "suffering-focused ethics" has increased during the 21st century, as it informs more directly and clearly about the view it denotes. Suffering-focused ethics that are deontological or appeal to moral character (like care ethics) have not been named with the term "negative".

Different suffering-focused ethics can also be distinguished depending on how much room they make for the consideration of values that differ from the reduction of suffering and to their relative importance with regards to the latter. According to some suffering-focused ethics there are no positive things in the world, only negative ones. Other views, however, accept that there are things that have positive value but only as long as they avoid that we suffer. 

Other positions, called lexical views, hold that no amount of other values can be more important than the reduction of suffering (lexicality in theory of value is the view that certain values trump over others). Moderate views instead hold that, while the reduction of suffering is more important than other values, there can be some aggregate amount of other values such that its promotion may end up being more important than the reduction of a certain amount of suffering.

Arguments in favor of suffering-focused ethics 

Some philosophers have endorsed suffering-focused views because they consider that these are the only views that can solve some problems in the field of population ethics, in particular the asymmetry. According to this asymmetry, there is no obligation to bring into existence an individual who we can expect to have a good life, but there is an obligation not to bring into existence an individual who we can expect to have a bad life. It is possible to respond to this asymmetry by accepting that we do have an obligation to create happy lives or by accepting that we do not have an obligation not to create unhappy lives. Notwithstanding this, both options, especially the latter, seem to be highly counter-intuitive. The view that avoiding the creation of suffering has precedence over the promotion of happiness, however, gives us a very intuitive solution to this problem. 

The asymmetry exemplifies the intuition which many people have that it is permissible not to try to provide pleasure to others but instead, it is mandatory to avoid causing them to suffer. This idea is also defended by arguing that most of us reject that it would be correct to cause an unknown individual to enjoy some pleasure by causing another one to suffer a suffering that is only slightly lower in intensity or duration. 

Some argue that there is a qualitative asymmetry that warrants prioritizing suffering reduction: suffering is inherently urgent and in severe cases unbearably bad. In contrast, a neutral absence of pleasure or any other proposed intrinsic value does not constitute an urgent problem that needs to be immediately "relieved".

Another argument in favor of the reduction of suffering would be that suffering, including extreme suffering, is present in massive amounts in the world and can be easily reduced, while bliss and extreme pleasure are much more scarce and hard to cause. This view finds precedents in the positions held by Buddhists and by 19th century philosophers.

See also 

 Antifrustrationism
 Antinatalism
 Buddhist ethics
 Eradication of suffering
 Negative consequentialism
 Negative utilitarianism
 Pain (philosophy)
 Painism (an ethical framework by Richard D. Ryder)
 Philosophical pessimism
 Speciesism
 Suffering risks

References

Further reading

External links 

 Algosphere Alliance: Vision
 Center for Reducing Suffering (2020) Suffering-Focused Ethics, Research
 Center on Long-Term Risk: "How can humanity best reduce suffering?"
  Organisation for the Prevention of Intense Suffering
 Qualia Research Institute (2020) Suffering
  Suffering-Focused Ethics Resources

Axiology
Suffering